Andrew Kayonde is a Zambian chess player. He was awarded the title of International Master in 2016.

Chess career
Kayonde won the Zambian Chess Championship six times  in 2009, 2014, 2015, 2016, 2017 and 2018.

References

External links 

Andrew Kayonde chess games at 365Chess.com

1988 births
Living people
Zambian chess players